Montebello della Battaglia is a comune (municipality) in the Province of Pavia in the Italian region Lombardy, located about 50 km south of Milan and about 20 km south of Pavia.

Montebello della Battaglia borders the following municipalities: Borgo Priolo, Casteggio, Codevilla, Lungavilla, Torrazza Coste, Verretto, Voghera.

It is famous for two battles: in that of 1800 the French army under Jean Lannes defeated an Austrian army. That of 1859, part of the Austro-Sardinian War, was a victory of the armies of France and Savoy, again over the Austrians.

Twin towns
Montebello della Battaglia is twinned with:

  Palestro, Italy, since 1984

References

Cities and towns in Lombardy